Selahattin Seyhun (born 28 June 1999) is a Turkish professional footballer who plays as a forward for Çatalcaspor on loan from Bucaspor 1928.

Professional career
On 5 December 2019, Seyhun signed his first professional contract with Kayserispor for 5 years. Seyhun made his professional debut for Kayserispor in a 6–2 Süper Lig loss to Trabzonspor on 28 December 2019.

References

External links
 
 

1999 births
People from Develi
Living people
Turkish footballers
Association football forwards
Kayserispor footballers
Çatalcaspor players
Süper Lig players
TFF Third League players